Chapman University is a private research university in Orange, California. It encompasses eleven schools and colleges, including Argyros School of Business & Economics, Attallah College of Educational Studies, College of Performing Arts, Crean College of Health and Behavioral Sciences, Dodge College of Film and Media Arts, Fowler School of Engineering, Fowler School of Law, Schmid College of Science & Technology, School of Communication, School of Pharmacy, and Wilkinson College of Arts, Humanities, & Social Sciences. It is nationally ranked by US News & World Report and is classified among "R2: Doctoral Universities – High research activity".

History

Founded in Woodland, California, as Hesperian College, the school began classes on March 4, 1861. Its opening was timed to coincide with the hour of Abraham Lincoln's first inauguration. Hesperian admitted students regardless of sex or race.

During its first decades of existence, the school relocated and changed names several times. The school initially relocated to Berkeley, California in 1896, merging with the Pierce Christian College (a school previously established in College City, California in 1874) to form the Berkeley Bible Seminary. Soon after, the school relocated to San Francisco and took on the name California Bible College. 

In 1920, the school moved again, this time to southern California, after its assets were acquired by the California Christian College,, a school that had been established by the  Southern California Convention in Long Beach, California in 1918. The two schools had been merged into a new institution called the California School of Christianity, located in Los Angeles. Three years later, in 1923, the school changed names yet again, back to the California Christian College.

In 1934, the school was renamed to Chapman College after the chairman of its board of trustees (and primary benefactor), C. C. Chapman. In 1954, it moved to its present campus in the city of Orange on the site formerly occupied by Orange High School, which had relocated.

Chapman established a Residence Education Center Program to serve military personnel in 1958. This evolved into Brandman University.

Chapman College became Chapman University in 1991. In that year, Dr. James L. Doti became president of Chapman University. Also in 1991, the Department of Education became the School of Education, now known as the Donna Ford Attallah College of Educational Studies, and the establishment of what is now known as Wilkinson College of Arts, Humanities, and Social Sciences.

The School of Film and Television, now Dodge College of Film and Media Arts opened in 1996. Between 2000 and 2010, Chapman University expanded to include the Rodgers Center for Holocaust Education, Leatherby Libraries, Fish Interfaith Center, Marion Knott Studios (The home of Dodge College of Film and Media Arts), the creation of the Argyros School's Economic Science Institute — led by Dr. Vernon L. Smith (2002 Nobel Prize winner in Economic Sciences, the Erin J. Anderson Athletics Complex and the Schmid College of Science and Technology. The Rinker Health Science Campus opened in Irvine, CA. in 2013, becoming the home for the School of Pharmacy. 

Mathematician Daniele C. Struppa became President in 2016, taking over for Dr. James L. Doti. In the same year, Musco Center for the Arts opened. The 1,110 seat concert hall draws more than 30,000 visitors per year and hosts both professional and student performances.

Chapman opened the Keck Center for Science and Engineering in 2018 with the Dale E. and Sarah Ann Fowler School of Engineering opening shortly after. Between 2018 and 2022, Chapman University earned a Carnegie Classification of R2: Doctoral University — High Research Activity, had its first Rhodes Scholar, Vidal Arroyo '19, and became nationally ranked by U.S. News & World Report.

Colleges and programs

Argyros School of Business and Economics

The George L. Argyros School of Business and Economics is located in the Arnold and Mabel Beckman Business and Technology Hall. Founded in 1977, the school is named after George L. Argyros, a Chapman alumnus and former U.S. Ambassador to Spain. Argyros has chaired the board of trustees of Chapman University since 1976, and has donated significant resources towards establishing Chapman as a leading national business school. The business school was renamed in Argyros' honor in 1999. In 2019 the Argyros School celebrated the 20th Anniversary of the naming of the school, capped off with a special fundraiser dinner on October 9, featuring special guest President George W. Bush. The event raised approximately $15 million for the school's endowment, $10 million of which was a surprise announcement by the Argyros family. The $15 million raised is believed to be the largest 1-day fundraising event in Orange County's history.

The Argyros School offers undergraduate and graduate degrees in business, including the Master of Business Administration and Master of Science. In 2018 Chapman's full-time MBA program was ranked #73 by Bloomberg/Businessweek.

The Argyros School of Business and Economics was officially nationally ranked as the 60th Best Undergraduate Bloomberg BusinessWeek Business School in 2014. In 2016, the Argyros School of Business and Economics rose to 34th in the same Bloomberg rankings.

The Argyros School is home to several research centers and institutes, including the A. Gary Anderson Center for Economic Research, the C. Larry Hoag Center for Real Estate and Finance, the Ralph W. Leatherby Center for Entrepreneurship and Ethics, the Walter Schmid Center for International Business, the Economic Science Institute (founded by Nobel Prize winner Vernon L. Smith and others in 2008), the Institute for the Study of Religion, Economics and Society (founded by Dr. Laurence Iannaccone in September 2009), and the Smith Institute for Political Economy and Philosophy.

The Leatherby Center for Entrepreneurship and Business Ethics is a program whose scope includes original research, scholarship, and the publication of several scholarly journals.

Donna Ford Attallah College of Educational Studies
Chapman University's Donna Ford Attallah College of Educational Studies offers an undergraduate Integrated Educational Studies (IES) degree; teaching, school counseling, and school psychology credentials; and graduate degrees in teaching, special education, school counseling, school psychology, and leadership, including a Ph.D. in education. The college is also home to various centers and programs for community engagement and research, including the Centro Comunitario de Educación, Paulo Freire Democratic Project (PFDP), and Thompson Policy Institute on Disability and Autism.

The School of Education at Chapman University became the College of Educational Studies in August 2008. In 2017, the college was named in honor of Donna Ford Attallah. The current home of the Attallah College is Chapman's Reeves Hall, which was one of the first buildings constructed for Orange Union High School on the site in 1913, added to the National Register for Historic Places in 1975, and renovated and reopened to the public in February 2018.

The Attallah College or its programs are accredited by the Council Accreditation of Educator Preparation, Commission on Teacher Credentialing, National Association of School Psychologists, and International School Psychology Association.

Dodge College of Film and Media Arts

The college has been recognized as one of the top ten film schools in the world and ranked #4 by The Hollywood Reporter among American film schools.

Crean College of Health and Behavioral Sciences
Formerly part of Chapman University's Schmid College of Science and Technology, the Crean College of Health and Behavioral Sciences officially became its own independent college at Chapman University on June 1, 2014.

Undergraduate programs in Crean College of Health and Behavioral Sciences include B.S. Applied Human Physiology, B.S. Health Sciences, and B.A. Psychology. Graduate and post-baccalaureate programs include M.A. Marriage and Family Therapy (MFT), M.S. Communication Sciences & Disorders, a MMS Physician Assistant (set to open in 2015), a Doctor of Physical Therapy (PT) (accredited since 1928, making it one of the oldest such programs in the United States), and a Transitional Doctor of Physical Therapy.

The physical therapy, communication sciences & disorders, and physician assistant programs are housed on Chapman University's Harry and Diane Rinker Health Science Campus in Irvine, California.

Wilkinson College of Arts, Humanities, and Social Sciences
Wilkinson College of Arts, Humanities, and Social Sciences is the largest college at Chapman University and is composed of the departments of art, English, history, world languages and cultures, peace studies, philosophy, political science, religious studies, and sociology.

Dale E. Fowler School of Law

The Chapman University School of Law is located in Kennedy Hall. Law degrees offered include the Juris Doctor (J.D.) and Master of Laws (LL.M.) degrees in various specialties.

Dale E. and Sarah Ann Fowler School of Engineering
Since opening in fall 2019, the Chapman University school has grown to include undergraduate programs in computer science, data analytics, software engineering and game development programming. A minor in computer engineering is also available. The university launched a bachelor's degree program in computer engineering in fall 2020, electrical engineering in fall 2021, and a master's degree program in computer science in fall 2022. Further expansion targets programs in biomedical and environmental engineering.

College of Performing Arts
Chapman University's College of Performing Arts, founded in 2007, operates in divisions: the Hall-Musco Conservatory of Music, the Department of Dance, and the Department of Theatre. The Conservatory of Music offers a Bachelor of Music (B.M.), the Dance Department offers a Bachelor of Fine Arts (B.F.A) and a Bachelor of Arts (B.A.), and the Theatre Department offers the Bachelor of Arts (B.A.). The Theatre Department also offer two Bachelor of Fine Arts (B.F.A.) programs—Theatre Performance and Screen Acting—taught in conjunction with the Dodge Film School.

Schmid College of Science and Technology
Chapman University's Schmid College of Science and Technology was founded in 2008 when science-related degree programs (then housed in the Wilkinson School of Humanities and Social Sciences) were migrated to the new college. In 2014, the Schmid College underwent a reorganization to create the Crean College of Health and Behavioral Sciences. In 2019, the undergraduate programs computer science, data analytics, software engineering, and game development programming transferred out of Schmid College to start the new Fowler School of Engineering.

In addition to its undergraduate and graduate programs, Schmid College is home to various centers for research. Among them are the Center of Excellence in Computation, Algebra and Topology (CECAT), the Center of Excellence in Complex and Hyper-complex Analysis (CECHA) and the Center of Excellence in Earth Systems Modeling and Observations (CEESMO). Schmid College is also affiliated with the Institute for Quantum Studies, whose list of physicists, includes a 2013 Nobel Prize recipient and a 2010 Presidential Medal of Honor winner.

Schmid College of Science and Technology recently expanded and moved into the new 140,000 sq. ft. Keck Center for Science and Engineering on Chapman's main campus in Orange, California. The research facility contains 45 research and teaching labs, 50 faculty offices, seven student-collaboration spaces, and an outdoor amphitheater. The aesthetic of the building was inspired by the work of American architect, Frank Lloyd Wright.

School of Pharmacy
The Chapman University School of Pharmacy (CUSP) is located at the Rinker Campus in Irvine. Pharmacy degrees include the Doctor of Pharmacy (Pharm.D.), a Master of Science in Pharmaceutical Science (MSPS), and a Doctor of Philosophy (Ph.D.) in Pharmaceutical Sciences. The Chapman School of Pharmacy also offers an accelerated five-year Doctor of Pharmacy program to qualified high school seniors.

School of Communication 
The School of Communication is located on the university's main campus and housed within Doti Hall. The school currently consists of three undergraduate majors for students to choose from, including: BA in Communication Studies, BA in Strategic & Corporate Communication, and BA in Global Communication and World Languages (which allows students to study communication while also emphasizing in a particular language). The school also offers some graduate programs, including an MS in Health and Strategic Communication as well as a PhD program.

Fowler School of Engineering 
The Fowler School of Engineering is the newest school within Chapman University. Majors within the school include a BS in Computer Engineering, BS in Computer Science, BS in Data Science, BS in Electrical Engineering, and BS in Software Engineering. Several other minors, such as Game Development Programming, are also housed within the school as well as several graduate programs. The school is housed in Chapman's new Swenson Hall of Engineering, which comprises various lab and maker spaces.

Brandman University

Brandman University was a separate, fully accredited, university within the Chapman University System, which had over 25 campuses throughout California and Washington, and a campus online. In September 2021, Brandman reaffiliated with the University of Massachusetts System via a change of control agreement and rebranded as University of Massachusetts Global (UMass Global).

Rankings and admissions

In U.S. News & World Reports 2020 rankings of the best colleges in America, the university was moved from the master's-level universities in the Western region to the National Universities group, with a debut ranking of tied at 125th. The reclassification was due to Chapman's elevation to R2 status by Carnegie Classification of Institutions of Higher Education in recognition of its high research activity. U.S. News uses the Carnegie Classifications for its categorization of universities.

For U.S. News & World Reports 2021 rankings, Chapman University was ranked tied for 124th overall among national universities, tied for 39th among 73 national universities evaluated for "Best Undergraduate Teaching", tied for 68th out of 83 for "Most Innovative Schools", tied for 86th of 142 for "Best Colleges for Veterans", and tied at 224th of 389 schools for "Top Performers on Social Mobility". The business school was ranked tied for 74th, and the law school tied for 111th, in the U.S. for 2021

For the Class of 2022 (enrolling fall 2018), Chapman received 14,198 applications, accepted 7,605 (53.6%), and enrolled 1,660. For the freshmen who enrolled, the average SAT score was 640 for reading and writing and 638 for math, while the average ACT composite score was 27.9. The average high school GPA was 3.75 (unweighted) on a 4.0 scale.

Holocaust education
The Barry and Phyllis Rodgers Center for Holocaust Education was founded by Marilyn Harran, Ph.D., in February 2000. It sponsors an annual Holocaust remembrance writing competition and hosts a regular Distinguished lecture series.

The Sala and Aron Samueli Holocaust Memorial Library, funded by Henry Samueli, is located on the fourth floor of the university's Leatherby Libraries. On April 11, 2005, sixty years after he was liberated from the Buchenwald concentration camp, Elie Wiesel dedicated the Samueli Holocaust Memorial Library, and a large bust of Wiesel stands at the entrance to the facility.

The collection includes a first edition of The Diary of Anne Frank in Dutch.

Athletics
Chapman athletic teams are the Panthers. The university is a member of the Division III (non-scholarship) level of the National Collegiate Athletic Association (NCAA), primarily competing in the Southern California Intercollegiate Athletic Conference (SCIAC) since the 2011–12 academic year; which they were a member on a previous stint from 1950–51 to 1951–52. The Panthers previously competed in the California Collegiate Athletic Association (CCAA) of the NCAA Division II ranks from to 1978–79 to 1992–93, and as an NCAA D-III Independent from 1993–94 to 2010–11.

Chapman competes in 21 intercollegiate varsity sports (10 men's and 11 women's): Men's sports include baseball, basketball, cross country, football, golf, soccer, swimming & diving, tennis, track & field and water polo; while women's sports include basketball, cross country, golf, lacrosse, soccer, softball, swimming & diving, tennis, track & field, volleyball and water polo.

Chapman University has won seven NCAA national titles. As a member of the NCAA Division II, the Panthers won one baseball title (1968) and three men's tennis titles (1985, 1987, 1988). After moving to NCAA Division III, the Panthers won the 1995 Division III softball championship and later the 2003 and 2019 Division III baseball championships.

Accomplishments
The Chapman softball team appeared in one Women's College World Series in 1979.

In 2011, the women's lacrosse team won the WCLL National Championships in Arizona. In 2016, the men's lacrosse team won the MCLA National Championship.

In the 2014, 2017, and 2019 seasons, the Chapman University Panther football team ended their season undefeated in their conference and won the SCIAC championship.

The 2019 men's baseball team defeated Birmingham-Southern College to become the DIII NCAA National Champions.

The football and basketball teams are broadcast by the Chapman Sports Broadcast Network (CSBN) to local Channel 6 in Orange and on Chapman's athletic website. CSBN is a student-run, student-produced independent sports network created by students at Chapman University's Dodge College of Film and Media arts.

Notable people

Current and former faculty
 Yakir Aharonov – Professor, James J. Farley Professorship in Natural Philosophy; Wolf Prize and National Medal of Science recipient
 Brian Alters – Professor and Director, Evolution Education Research Center
 Richard Bausch – Professor in Department of English
 Andrew Carroll – Presidential Fellow in American War Letters; Founding Director of the Center for American War Letters
 Martha Coolidge – Professor, Lawrence and Kristina Dodge College of Film and Media Arts; Emmy nominated film director; elected in 2001 as the first and only female president of the Directors Guild of America
 George Csicsery – 2017–2019 Presidential Fellow
 Grace Fong D.M.A. – Director of Keyboard Studies at Conservatory of Music; winner of such honors as the 2006 Leeds International Piano Competition
 Carolyn Forché – Presidential Fellow in Creative Writing; American poet
 Kyle Harrison – Men's lacrosse assistant coach and professional lacrosse player
 Hugh Hewitt – Professor, Dale E. Fowler School of Law; He served for six years in the Reagan Administration in a variety of posts including Assistant Counsel in the White House and Special Assistant to the Attorney General of the United States
 Jack Horner – Presidential Fellow; technical adviser for all Jurassic Park movies and was Michael Crichton's basis for the Alan Grant character
 Laurence Iannaccone – Director, Institute for the Study of Religion, Economics, and Society; Professor of Economics
 Cheryl Boone Isaacs – Lecturer, Lawrence and Kristina Dodge College of Film and Media Arts; serving third term as President of the Academy of Motion Picture Arts and Sciences by the organization's Board of Governors; inducted into the NAACP Hall of Fame in 2014
 Bill Kroyer – Professor, Director, Digital Arts Program; one of the first animators to make the leap to computer animation as computer image choreographer on Disney's ground-breaking 1982 feature, Tron.
 Tibor Machan (1939–2016) – held the R. C. Hoiles Chair of Business Ethics and Free Enterprise, Argyros School of Business & Economics
 Peter McLaren – Distinguished Professor in Critical Studies, Attallah College of Educational Studies
Prexy Nesbitt – Presidential Fellow in Peace Studies
 Michael Shermer – Presidential Fellow in General Education, author of numerous books and founder of The Skeptics Society
 Rebecca Skloot – Presidential Fellow in Creative Science Writing
 Mark Skousen – Professor, Mark Skousen, Ph.D., editor of Forecasts & Strategies, is a nationally known investment expert, economist, university professor and author of more than 25 books. In 2018, he was awarded the Triple Crown in Economics for his work in economic theory, history and education, and has been identified as one of the 20 most influential living economists
 Vernon L. Smith – Nobel Laureate in Economic Science (2002); founder of Economic Science Institute and Smith Institute for Political Economy and Philosophy
 Joel Stern – chairman and chief executive officer of Stern Value Management, formerly Stern Stewart & Co, and the creator and developer of Economic Value Added "EVA"
 Bart Wilson – Donald P. Kennedy Endowed Chair of Economics and Law in the Argyros School of Business & Economics

Alumni
 Paul Anderson – member, Nevada State Assembly
 Anastasia Baranova – Russian-American actress
 Gustavo Arellano ('01) – former publisher and editor of OC Weekly and author of the column ¡Ask a Mexican! 
 George Argyros ('59) – business executive, former U.S. Ambassador to Spain, former owner of Seattle Mariners of Major League Baseball
 Emmett Ashford ('41) – first African American umpire in Major League Baseball
 David E. Bonior (MA '72) – U.S. Congressman from Michigan (1977–2003), House Minority Whip (1995–2002), House Majority Whip (1991–95)
 Stephen "tWitch" Boss – DJ and dancer
 Sabrina Bryan - dancer, choreographer, actress and singer. Member of The Cheetah Girls
 Amy Sterling Casil - science fiction writer (and later writing instructor at Chapman)
 Matt and Ross Duffer ('07) – co-creators of the television series Stranger Things
 Hannah Einbinder – stand-up comedian and actor, known for Hacks
 Bob Einstein – film and television actor
 Tim Flannery ('79) – Major League Baseball player for 11 seasons, coach for San Francisco Giants
 Colin Hanks (did not graduate, left in 1997) – film and television actor
 Cooper Hefner ('15) – chief creative officer of Playboy Enterprises
 Jelena Jensen ('03) – adult film actress, nude model, webcam model, radio personality
 Ben York Jones ('06) – screenwriter and actor, co-creator of the television series Everything Sucks!
 Leslie Jones (did not graduate, left in 1986) – comedian, former Saturday Night Live cast member
 Randy Jones – former professional baseball player, San Diego Padres, New York Mets; 1976 Cy Young Award Winner
 Tyler Patrick Jones - actor
 Harshvardhan Kapoor – Bollywood actor
 Wayne W. Lambert – Brig. Gen. (USAF) (Ret.) (MBA '76), commanded Strategic Air Command forces in Europe (7th Air Division) 1983–1986
 Steve Lavin – former head coach of St. John's men's basketball team (2010–2015), former head coach of UCLA men's basketball team (1996–2002)
 Chris Lee (MBA '97) – U.S. Congressman (January 6, 2009 – February 9, 2011)
 Jeff Levering ('03) – Milwaukee Brewers play-by-play announcer
 Stephen Nelson ('11) - MLB/NHL Network television personality, co-host of Intentional Talk, and play-by-play announcer for the MLB Network-produced Friday Night Baseball on Apple TV+.
 Jeff Lewis ('93) – real estate speculator, interior designer, and television personality on Flipping Out
 Kevin Kwan Loucks (EMBA '17) - CEO of Chamber Music America; co-founder of Chamber Music OC; member of classical music ensemble Trio Céleste
 Kellan Lutz – fashion model and actor
 Joanna Rosholm ('07) – press secretary to First Lady Michelle Obama
 Jim Saia – college basketball head coach
 Loretta Sanchez ('82) – Congresswoman, California's 46th Congressional District
 Utkarsh Sharma – Indian actor
 Jim Silva (MA) – member, California State Assembly
 Justin Simien ('05) – filmmaker, actor, and author; director of Dear White People
 Jodie Sweetin ('05) – actress, star of television series Full House and Fuller House
 Jason Thornberry, writer
 Carles Torrens (BFA 2008) – film director
 Laura Yeager – U.S. Army general, first woman to command an Army infantry division

Notes

References

External links

 
 Official athletics website

 
Universities and colleges in Orange County, California
Universities and colleges affiliated with the Christian Church (Disciples of Christ)
Education in Orange, California
Educational institutions established in 1861
Schools accredited by the Western Association of Schools and Colleges
Sports in Orange, California
1861 establishments in California
Religion in Orange County, California
Private universities and colleges in California